"Exiting the Vampire Castle" is an essay written by the English theorist Mark Fisher for the online publication The North Star in 2013. It argues for increased leftist solidarity by departing from the phenomenon of online callout culture to instead orient activity around organization of efforts around the accountability of one's economic class, rather than around traits in identity and culture.

Synopsis 
Fisher argues that a largely online style of identity-based leftist discourse grounded in "witch-hunting moralism" halts productive leftist discourse and undermines class politics. In particular, the combination of a primary focus on identity and the policing of others' speech is deleterious. Fisher saw the turn from class and materialism towards identity as a move from objective outward-facing goals to subjective inward goals that result in fragmentation of the left's efforts and community.

Reception 
Jacobin magazine described "Exiting the Vampire Castle" as Fisher's "most loved and hated essay".

Influence 
In her book Kill All Normies, Angela Nagle grounds her critique of the left on Fisher's essay. She uses the essay to diagnose the political situation of the 2016 United States presidential election in particular and leftist use of social media platforms in general.

Michael Brooks' book Against the Web uses concepts from "Exiting the Vampire Castle" to describe the limits Brooks observes in leftist tactics. Noting the condemnation and alienation common among leftists of the Castle, Brooks proposes a "cosmopolitan socialism" alternative built on the works of Cornel West, Amartya Sen, and C. L. R. James.

References

External links

2013 essays